GNRC (formerly known as Guwahati Neurological Research Centre) is a healthcare Centre in North East India. It was established in 1987 by neurologist Dr. Nomal Chandra Borah. At present, it operates five hospitals – GNRC Dispur, GNRC Sixmile, GNRC Medical (Amingaon), GNRC North Guwahati and GNRC Medical Barasat in Kolkata under GNRC Community Hospitals Limited, formed in 2001.

References

External links
 

Hospitals in Assam
Buildings and structures in Guwahati
Hospitals established in 1987
1987 establishments in Assam